In 650–51, the Sasanian emperor Yazdegerd III made Estakhr, which is approximately 8 km northeast of Persepolis, the new capital of Sassanian Empire and tried to plan an organized resistance against the Arabs; and after some time he went to Gor, but Estakhr failed to put up a strong resistance, and was soon sacked by the Arabs, who killed over 40,000 defenders. The Arabs then quickly seized Gor, Kazerun and Siraf, while Yazdegerd III fled to Kerman. Thus ended the Muslim conquest of Fars; however, the series of revolts still haunted the town until it was pacified for once by AD 693 and the status as provincial capital was moved to Shiraz.

Notes

Muslim conquest of Persia